Kenton School is an Academy situated in Newcastle upon Tyne in Tyne and Wear, England.

It is situated near Kenton Lane in Kenton, educating Key Stage 3 - 5, Years 7 - 11.

Kenton School is a specialist Arts and Technology School and has been granted several marks of achievement including a Gold Artsmark from the Arts Council of England and a 2008 Sportsmark.

The sixth form building is used by both sixth formers and pupils attending the main academy as well as working as a local community college (Kenton College). A 2012 Ofsted report graded the school as Good, a drop from the Outstanding status they obtained in 2009.

History 

Construction on the original Kenton School started in 1958, and the school was opened by the Right Honourable Lord Morrison of Lambeth, better known as Herbert Morrison, on Friday 17 March 1961.

The development of the school continued through the addition of new buildings. East Block was the first to be built – closely followed by West Block in 1961, the plans for these buildings were submitted in 1957 and approved in 1958.

South Block was added to the site in 1971 which was linked to the main school by the addition of a corrugated green fibreglass-clad bridge connecting South Block to West Block. Eventually, the Green Bridge lost its colour, having been reclad in grey-painted corrugated metal, and remained in place all the way until demolition of the buildings between 2008 and 2009. The school also had its own adjoining swimming pool.

In 1978, North Block was added to the rear of East Block, following the closure of the adjacent Roman Catholic school, and in 1999, a new College Building was added to the campus. The College Building was officially opened by the then School's Minister, Estelle Morris.

Following 47 years in the original school buildings, the school moved into a new state-of-the-art building in Autumn 2008 and had its official opening on Friday, 2 July 2010.

The new school was officially opened by the film director and former Kenton School pupil, Mike Figgis.

Former headteachers 

 Eric Hackett (1960–1)
 Charles Jary (1965–1972)
 Doreen Inness (1972–1981)
 Barbara Payne (1981–1992)
 Fran Done (1992–1993) (acting)
 Mike Gibbons (1994–1997)
 Fran Done (1997–1998) (acting)
 David Pearmain (1998-2015)
 Sarah Holmes-Carne (2015-2022)
 Bill Jordan CBE (2022) (acting)
 Jason Holt (2023–present)

David Pearmain stepped down as headteacher in August 2015 and became the chief executive of Kenton Schools Academy Trust, under which Kenton School and Studio West operate. In 2017, Pearmain stepped down as chief executive, and was replaced by Kevin McDermid. In 2022, Ian Kershaw was appointed chief executive of the Trust, which rebranded as Northern Leaders Trust in May of that year.

Kenton School's principal is Jason Holt. The academy’s current vice-principals are Richard Devlin, Noel Stoddart and Claire Gibson.

Academy conversion
In 2011, the school undertook consultation to investigate conversion to Academy status. This was met with criticism by the NAS/UWT, the NUT, and the ATL, representatives of whom took strike action in September of that year. On 1 May 2012 Kenton School officially converted to an Academy. Throughout the process it was decided that the school's name would not change although for legal reasons Kenton School (Newcastle) is its registered name.

Studio school
In September 2014, Kenton Academy opened a new studio school, Studio West, in the West Denton area of Newcastle upon Tyne. Studio West is based on the All Saints College site, after All Saints College closed in the summer of 2014.

The Kentonian 
Kenton School had a newspaper, The Kentonian, which was written by staff and pupils at Kenton School. The paper came out four times a year and typically contained staff interviews and news items about life in Kenton School. However, it is no longer published.

Notable alumni
 Chi Onwurah – Labour MP for Newcastle Central
 Paul Dummett – Newcastle United and Wales footballer
 Mike Figgis – Film director
 Muzoon Almellehan – Syrian activist 
 Jamie Mole – Former Heart of Midlothian footballer
 Danielle George – Engineer, astrophysicist and president of the Institution of Engineering & Technology

References

External links
 Kenton School website
 Kenton School Ofsted Report

Secondary schools in Newcastle upon Tyne
Academies in Newcastle upon Tyne